Dag Bengt Wennlund (born 6 October 1963) is a retired javelin thrower from Sweden, who represented his native country at three consecutive Summer Olympics (1988, 1992 and 1996). He is a three-time Swedish champion in the men's javelin event (1985, 1986 and 1991). His personal best is 85.02, thrown on May 28, 1995 in Alvesta.

Achievements

References
 

1963 births
Living people
Swedish male javelin throwers
Athletes (track and field) at the 1988 Summer Olympics
Athletes (track and field) at the 1992 Summer Olympics
Athletes (track and field) at the 1996 Summer Olympics
Olympic athletes of Sweden
Sportspeople from Västra Götaland County
People from Mariestad Municipality